Carlos Báez Appleyard (born 12 June 1982 in Asunción, Paraguay) is a Paraguayan football defender currently playing for O'Higgins in Chile.

External links
 Argentine Primera statistics

1982 births
Living people
Sportspeople from Asunción
Paraguayan footballers
Paraguayan expatriate footballers
Association football defenders
Cerro Porteño players
Club Atlético Independiente footballers
Arsenal de Sarandí footballers
Cúcuta Deportivo footballers
O'Higgins F.C. footballers
Chilean Primera División players
Argentine Primera División players
Categoría Primera A players
Expatriate footballers in Argentina
Expatriate footballers in Chile
Expatriate footballers in Colombia